The 1986 NCAA Division I women's volleyball tournament began with 32 teams and ended on December 20, 1986, when Pacific defeated Nebraska 3 games to 0 in the NCAA championship match.

Pacific won their second straight NCAA title in volleyball with an easy sweep of Nebraska by the scores of 15-12, 15-4, 15-4.

Nebraska became the first non-California or Hawaii university to make the NCAA national championship match (although it happened six times in the AIAW national championships in the 1970s). Semifinalist Texas joined Nebraska in becoming the first non-California or Hawaii universities to make the NCAA final four (although four such others reached title matches in the 1970s).

Brackets

Northwest regional

South regional

Mideast regional

West regional

Final Four - Alex G. Spanos Center, Stockton, California

See also
NCAA Women's Volleyball Championship

References

NCAA Women's Volleyball Championship
NCAA Division I Women's
Sports competitions in Stockton, California
NCAA Division I women's volleyball tournament
NCAA Division I women's volleyball tournament
College sports tournaments in California
Volleyball in California
Women's sports in California